Russia–Somalia relations is the bilateral relationship between Russia and Somalia. A Somali Embassy currently operates in Moscow. Russia's embassy in Djibouti represents Russia in Somalia.

History

Early relations 
Diplomatic relations between the Soviet Union and Somalia were established on September 11, 1960. In June 1961, an agreement was signed on cultural cooperation between the countries. In 1962, the first military contacts took place, with 50 military personnel from Somalia being sent to get military education in the Soviet Union. At the same time, the USSR provided Somalia with a loan of $32 million to modernize and increase the size of the Somali National Army. The Soviets also assisted in humanitarian work, helping the Barre government address the Abaartii Dabadheer drought in the northern regions of the country (specifically in the Hobyo and Caynaba regions), airlifting around 90,000 people from the devastated regions. On July 11, 1974, the USSR and Somalia signed a Treaty of Friendship and Cooperation for a period of 20 years.

Soviet-Somali split 
After the beginning of the Ogaden War against Ethiopia, a Soviet ally, relations between the countries were severed. In November 1977, the President Siad Barre announced the termination of the 1974 Soviet-Somali Friendship Treaty. Barre subsequently expelled all Soviet advisers, and personally switched allegiance from the Eastern Bloc to the West, particularly the United States. In 1978, Barre railed against Soviet influence in the Horn of Africa at a summit of the Organisation of African Unity.

Modern era 
Currently, Russian-Somali relations are at a very low level, with Russia having sent humanitarian aid to Somalia several times. In May 2010, Somalia warned that relations with Russia may be harmed over the MV Moscow University hijacking, after which Somalia's government demanded an apology from the Russian government. On 19 April 2016, Somali Prime Minister Omar Sharmarke held a bilateral meeting with Russian Foreign Minister Sergei Lavrov, where he requested Russian assistance to strengthen the Somali Armed Forces in the fight against terrorist organization Al-Shabaab. In January 2018, Deputy Prime Minister of Russia Arkady Dvorkovich met with Hassan Ali Khaire within the framework of the Davos Economic Forum.

Ambassadors

From Somalia to Russia 

 Mohamed Ibrahim Liqliiqato (1969–1970)
 Mohamed Mohamoud Handule (27 July 2007 – 2015)
 Abdullahi Mohamud Warsame (since 2016)

From Russia to Somalia 

 Mikhalil Golovanov (since 2019)

See also 
 Foreign relations of Russia
 Foreign relations of Somalia

References

External links 

 Somali Embassy in Moscow

Somalia
Russia
Russia–Somalia relations